IndigNation was Singapore's annual, month-long lesbian, gay, bisexual, and queer pride season, first held in August 2005 to coincide with the republic's 40th National Day.

Background
IndigNation begun as a series of LGBT-themed events meant to fill in the gap that Singapore's banning of the Nation parties created. With the promise that Prime Minister Lee Hsien Loong made in August 2004, allowing indoor talks to proceed ahead without a license from the police, it was an ideal time to organize talks, workshops, and related events as part of the line-up for IndigNation.

Credits
Fridae.com, Asia's largest gay and lesbian portal, has supported the festival since its inception through media and financial sponsorship through its Fridae Community Development Fund, and fundraising events. A gala screening of the film Wilde about Irish-born playwright, Oscar Wilde, in May 2008 raised S$10,000 for Indignation and provided a seed fund to establish the Rascals Prize, a biennial award for the best research work related to the subject of gays, lesbians, bisexuals and transgender people (LGBT) and Singapore. In 2009, the fundraising gala premiere of a biopic about America's first openly gay, publicly elected politician, Harvey Milk, raised S$14,000 for Indignation, Pinkdot Singapore and gay filmmaker Loo Zihan's new project. In the same year, the fundraising gala premiere of Ang Lee’s Taking Woodstock raised S$6,000 for Indignation and other LGBT-related community projects in Singapore.

References

External links
IndigNation website

LGBT events in Singapore
Festivals established in 2005
Electronic music festivals in Singapore
Music festivals established in 2004
LGBT festivals in Asia